Georgia Hale (born 9 August 1995) is a New Zealand rugby league footballer who plays for the Leeds Rhinos in the RFL Women's Super League.

Background
A Richmond Roses junior, Hale represented New Zealand in touch and tag football before switching to rugby league.

Playing career
In 2014, she was a member of the New Zealand squad for their three-game series against Australia at the 2014 NRL Auckland Nines.

On 3 May 2015, she made her Test debut for New Zealand, coming off the bench in a 14–22 loss to Australia at Suncorp Stadium. On 6 May 2016, she was named Player of the Match in New Zealand's 26–16 ANZAC Test win over Australia. On 16 September 2016, she was named New Zealand Player of the Year at the RLPA Players' Champion awards in Sydney.

In 2017, she was named vice-captain of New Zealand for the 2017 Women's Rugby League World Cup. She played three games in the tournament but was omitted from the team that lost to Australia in the final.

2018
In 2018, Hale joined the New Zealand Warriors for the inaugural season of the NRL Women's Premiership.

2019
On 21 August, she was named captain of the Warriors and moved to the  position. On 19 October, she started for New Zealand in their 17–15 2019 Rugby League World Cup 9s final win over Australia.

2020
On 20 February, Hale was named the Young New Zealander of the Year.

In September, Hale was one of five New Zealand-based Warriors' players to travel to Australia to play in the 2020 NRL Women's premiership. Due to COVID-19 restrictions, the players had to quarantine for 14 days on entering Australia and 14 days on return to New Zealand when the season was completed. On 27 October, Hale won the Veronica White Medal for her off-field work in her local community.

2021
In 2021, Hale relocated to Australia, joining the Tweed Heads Seagulls in the QRL Women's Premiership.

2022 
In October she was selected for the New Zealand squad at the delayed 2021 Women's Rugby League World Cup in England.

Achievements and accolades

Individual
RLPA New Zealand Women's Player of the Year: 2016
Veronica White Medal: 2020

Team
2019 Rugby League World Cup 9s: New Zealand – Winners

References

External links
New Zealand Warriors profile 

1995 births
Living people
Leeds Rhinos Women players
New Zealand female rugby league players
New Zealand women's national rugby league team players
Rugby league locks
Rugby league halfbacks
Rugby league five-eighths
New Zealand Warriors (NRLW) players